Birmingham Acock's Green was a short-lived constituency of the House of Commons of the Parliament of the United Kingdom from 1945 to 1950. It elected one Member of Parliament (MP) by the first past the post system of election.

Boundaries 
The County Borough of Birmingham wards of Acock's Green and Hall Green.

Before 1945 the area formed part of the Birmingham Moseley constituency. That division had over 100,000 electors and was considered to be overlarge. As an interim measure, before the Boundary Commission for England carried out the first periodic review of Parliamentary boundaries, it was authorised by the House of Commons (Redistribution of Seats) Act 1944 (7 & 8 Geo. 6, c. 41) to divide the largest constituencies.

In the first periodic review, which was given effect by the Representation of the People Act 1948 (which applied from the United Kingdom general election, 1950), Acock's Green ward became part of Birmingham Yardley and Hall Green ward gave its name to the new seat of Birmingham Hall Green.

Members of Parliament

Election

See also
List of former United Kingdom Parliament constituencies

References 

 Boundaries of Parliamentary Constituencies 1885-1972, compiled and edited by F.W.S. Craig (Parliamentary Reference Publications 1972)
 British Parliamentary Election Results 1918-1949, compiled and edited by F.W.S. Craig (Revised edition - Macmillan Press 1977)
 Who's Who of British Members of Parliament, Volume IV 1945-1979, edited by M. Stenton and S. Lees (Harvester Press 1981)

Constituencies of the Parliament of the United Kingdom established in 1945
Constituencies of the Parliament of the United Kingdom disestablished in 1950
Politics of Warwickshire
Parliamentary constituencies in Birmingham, West Midlands (historic)